is the fourth full album by Japanese novelty heavy metal band Animetal, released through Cutting Edge Records on September 12, 2001. The album consists of a non-stop marathon of metal covers of anime themes from the 1970s, 1980s, and 1990s. It also marked the return of Animetal after a two-year hiatus. However, it was also the last to feature lead guitarist She-Ja, who was then replaced by Syu on the band's subsequent releases.

Track listing 
All tracks are arranged by Animetal.

Personnel
 - Lead vocals
 - Guitar
Masaki - Bass

with

Katsuji - Drums
 - Vocals (8)
NOV - Vocals (19)
 - Female vocals (31)

Footnotes

References

External links

2001 albums
Animetal albums
Japanese-language albums
Covers albums
Avex Group albums